Sainte-Anne-des-Monts is a city in the Gaspésie–Îles-de-la-Madeleine region of the province of Quebec in Canada.

Sainte-Anne-des-Monts, a small city between the Chic-Choc Mountains and sea, is on the south shore of the Saint Lawrence river estuary. In addition to Sainte-Anne-des-Monts itself, the municipality also encompasses the communities of L'Anse-de-l'Église, L'Anse-Sainte-Anne-des-Monts, Mont-Albert, Petit-Tourelle, Ruisseau-à-Patates, and Tourelle.

History

The name of Notre-Dame first appeared on schematic maps in 1709.  The official nomenclature came from the seigneurie of Sainte-Anne-des-Monts, conceded to Denis Riverin in 1688. The first settlers arrived in 1815 and established small fisheries. The place was incorporated as a municipality in 1855. The city was a centre for pilgrimage at the beginning of the twentieth century.  It was partially destroyed by fire in 1915.

In 1968, Sainte-Anne-des-Monts gained city status. On February 2, 2000, the City of Sainte-Anne-des-Monts and the Municipality of Tourelle were merged to form the new City of Sainte-Anne-des-Monts–Tourelle. It was given its current name on February 10, 2001.

Economy
Tourism and fishing are the local industries. Exploramer is an activity complex on the Saint-Lawrence River aquatic fauna where you can see an aquarium offering 21 tanks which contain fish, marine organisms, a thematic exhibition about the sea, offshore excursions, and many more cultural events.

On the other side of the mountains, the National Park of Gaspésie provides access to the McGerrigle and Chic-Chocs mountains. They offer a panoramic photographic opportunity to admire the apex of Mont-Jacques-Cartier, the second highest summit in Québec.

Demographics 

Mother tongue:
 English as first language: 0.1%
 French as first language: 98.6%
 English and French as first language: 0%
 Other as first language: 1.3%

Tourism

Sainte-Anne-des-Monts is the access point to Gaspésie National Park and the Chic-Choc Mountains. A common activity is to explore the forest and mountains by snowshoe, snowmobile or walking.

This area is visited by natural sites enthusiasts, with cross-country skiing, Telemark skiing, walking, horse riding, paragliding, sea kayaking, fishing in the river and snowmobiling on marked trails around the Gaspésie area.  Both moose and caribou (the last herd of the latter located south of the Saint Lawrence River) are found in the park.

A new activity has also arisen in Gaspésie. Known as D'Arbre en Arbre (tree to tree) it an adventure at the top of trees.

Transportation

The municipality is located along Quebec Route 132, which follows the coast of the Gaspé Peninsula. Quebec Route 299, locally called the Park Route, links Sainte-Anne-des-Monts to New Richmond, by taking a smooth and yet outstanding panoramic route through the boroughs. The same route also provides access to the Gaspésie National Park.

The federal government manages a wharf with a pier for pleasure boats.
The Sainte-Anne-des-Monts Aerodrome, with an asphalt runway, can be found on the outskirts of the municipality.
Transport by rail is not available.

Sainte-Anne-des-Monts is the center of collective transportation and para-transit for the Haute-Gaspésie area.

Services
Because of its size, the municipality is a node for a scattered population. There is a hospital, a CLSC, a high school, a police station, a court house, a cultural centre including an auditorium, libraries and several government offices servicing the area with regard to fishing and fauna. A college (CÉGEP) is located in Matane, only  from Sainte-Anne-des-Monts.

The municipality is the access point to the Parc de la Gaspésie, and offers a hotel, motels and restaurants. Popular chain restaurants and a chain convenience store can be found, such as Tim Hortons, Subway and Couche-Tard. There are two large grocery stores and gasoline stations.

Climate

See also
 List of cities in Quebec

References

External links

Répertoire des municipalités du Québec
Commission de toponymie du Québec
Affaires municipales et régions - cartes régionales

Cities and towns in Quebec
Incorporated places in Gaspésie–Îles-de-la-Madeleine